"I'm Still in Love with You" is the second single from American R&B/pop group New Edition as a sextet from their sixth studio album, Home Again (1996). The song was released on October 22, 1996 as the album's second single by MCA. Ralph Tresvant and Ricky Bell sing lead vocals; all six members sing background vocals throughout the song. The video for "I'm Still in Love with You" was shot at Villa Vizcaya in Miami, and once again featured all six members. The song was a big success on the US Billboard Hot 100, peaking at number seven, and was the second single to be certified gold from the Home Again project.

Critical reception
Larry Flick from Billboard wrote, "For this sweet and romantic rhythm ballad, lead vocals are handled by Ralph Tresvant, whose smooth tenor range tingles with dewey-eyed youth appeal. As the song builds to a warmly harmonious climax, memories of New Edition's salad days will likely run rampant in the minds of longtime fans. Look for this one to heat up airwaves well into the fall season."

Track listings and formats

 12" vinyl
 "I'm Still in Love with You" (LP Version)
 "You Don't Have to Worry" (Vocal Version) (featuring Missy Elliott)
 "You Don't Have to Worry" (Vocal Version) (featuring Fat Joe)

 12" promo
 "I'm Still In Love With You" (Concrete Jungle Full Version) — 4:45   
 "I'm Still In Love With You" (Concrete Jungle Instrumental) — 4:44   
 "I'm Still In Love With You" (Concrete Jungle Drumapella) — 4:45   
 "I'm Still In Love With You" (Unplugged Full Version) — 5:05   
 "I'm Still In Love With You" (Unplugged Instrumental) — 5:08   
 "I'm Still In Love With You" (Brooklyn Baller's Full Version) — 4:52   
 "I'm Still In Love With You" (Brooklyn Baller's Instrumental) — 4:47

 CD single
 "I'm Still in Love with You" (Single Edit)
 "I'm Still in Love with You" (Acappella)
 "I'm Still in Love with You" (Intro Version)
 "You Don't Have to Worry" (Vocal Version) (featuring Missy Elliott)

 Promo CD/maxi-single
 "I'm Still in Love with You" (Single Edit)        
 "I'm Still in Love with You" (Single Edit Long Intro)        
 "I'm Still in Love with You" (Album Version)        
 "I'm Still in Love with You" (Instrumental)        
 "I'm Still in Love with You" (Suite)        
 "I'm Still in Love with You" (Acappella)

Charts and certifications

Certifications

Credits
Ronnie DeVoe — background vocals
Bobby Brown — background vocals
Ricky Bell — lead vocals & background vocals
Michael Bivins — background vocals
Ralph Tresvant — lead vocals & background vocals
Johnny Gill — background vocals

References

1990s ballads
1996 singles
1996 songs
Pop ballads
Contemporary R&B ballads
Soul ballads
New Edition songs
Songs written by Jimmy Jam and Terry Lewis
Song recordings produced by Jimmy Jam and Terry Lewis
MCA Records singles